The Ministry of Information is one of the governmental bodies in the State of Kuwait. It was established on 7 January 1979. The ministry is currently held by Abdulrahman Badah Al Mutairi.

The Ministry operates the official radio and television of the State of Kuwait.

Television 
Kuwait Television
 KTV1
 KTV2
 KTV Sport
 KTV Sport Plus
 KTV Kids
 Al Qurain channel
 Al Araby Channel
 Ethraa Channel
 almajles channel

Radio 
 Radio Kuwait 1
 Kuwait Radio 2
 Kuwait Radio Quran
 Kuwait FM
 Easy FM 92.5
 Radio Classical Arabic 
 Radio Hona Kuwait
 Radio Shaabya
 SuperStation

References

External links 
  

1979 establishments in Kuwait
Government ministries of Kuwait
Kuwait
Mass media in Kuwait
Ministries established in 1979